{{DISPLAYTITLE:C12H17N}}
The molecular formula C12H17N (molar mass: 175.27 g/mol) may refer to:

 2-Benzylpiperidine
 4-Benzylpiperidine
 Indanylaminopropane
 2-Methyl-3-phenylpiperidine
 4-Phenylazepane
 Phenylethylpyrrolidine